Bohdan Dedyckiy (1827 - 1908) was a Ukrainian Muscovite writer, poet and journalist from Galicia.

He was the editor of the "Słowo" and "Zoria Hałyćka" newspapers. He promoted the view that there is only one Russian language, with two pronunciations - Russian and Ukrainian, and denied the existence of a separate Ukrainian language.

He published in iazychie, in the same dialect, he published an anonymous brochure in 1866 in Lviv: "W odin czas nauczitsja małorusinu po wełykoruski". He was of the opinion that in this way the knowledge of Russian literature would become popular among the Galician Rusyns (Ukrainians).

Bohdan Dedyckiy is buried at the Lychakiv Cemetery in Lviv, in the Russian journalists Bed of Honor.

References

Bibliography 
 Енциклопедія українознавства, Lviv 1993, t. 2, s. 520

Ukrainian writers
Ukrainian poets
Ukrainian journalists
Russophiles of Galicia
1827 births
1908 deaths